= Standard Market Design =

Electrical transmission guidelines of USA

Standard Market Design is a set of established guidelines governing the sale of electrical power and the operations of electrical transmission lines in the United States of America established by the Federal Energy Regulatory Commission.

The objective of standard market design for wholesale electric markets is to establish a common market framework that promotes economic efficiency and lower delivered energy costs, maintains power system reliability, mitigates significant market power and increases the choices offered to wholesale market participants. All customers should benefit from an efficient competitive wholesale energy market, whether or not they are in states that have elected to adopt retail access.
